New Xiang, also known as Chang-Yi (长益片 / 長益片) is the dominant form of Xiang Chinese. It is spoken in northeastern areas of Hunan, China adjacent to areas where Southwestern Mandarin and Gan are spoken. Under their influence, it has lost some of the conservative phonological characteristics that distinguish Old Xiang. While most linguists follow Yuan Jiahua in describing New Xiang as a subgroup of Xiang Chinese, Zhou Zhenhe and You Rujie classify it as Southwestern Mandarin.  However, New Xiang is still very difficult for Mandarin speakers to understand, particularly the old style of New Xiang.

Dialects and regions
New Xiang-speaking cities and counties are mainly located in the northeast part of Hunan, the lower river of Xiang and Zi. The Changsha dialect is representative. 
There are three main subdialects under New Xiang. 
 Chang-Tan
 Urban Changsha, Changsha County, Wangcheng District, Ningxiang, Liuyang*, Xiangyin, Miluo, Nanxian, Urban Zhuzhou, Zhuzhou County, Urban Xiangtan, Xiangtan County, Nanxian
 Yi-Yuan
 Urban Yiyang, Yuanjiang, Taojiang
 Yueyang
 Yueyang County, Yueyang

Suantang (酸汤) is a lect spoken by about 80,000 ethnic Miao people in Baibu (白布), Dihu (地湖), Dabaozi (大堡子), and Sanqiao (三锹) in Tianzhu, Huitong, and Jing counties of Hunan province. It is very similar to New Xiang, but is unintelligible with Southwestern Mandarin.

References

Xiang Chinese